Priam's Treasure is a cache of gold and other artifacts discovered by classical archaeologists Frank Calvert and Heinrich Schliemann at Hissarlik (also known as Troy) on the northwestern coast of modern Turkey. The majority of the artifacts are currently in the Pushkin Museum in Moscow.

Schliemann claimed the site to be that of Homeric Troy, and assigned the artifacts to the Homeric king Priam. This assignment is now thought to be a result of Schliemann's zeal to find sites and objects mentioned in the Homeric epics which take place in what is now northwestern Turkey. At the time the stratigraphy at Troy had not been solidified, which was done subsequently by the archaeologist Carl Blegen. The layer in which Priam's Treasure was alleged to have been found was assigned to Troy II, whereas Priam would have been king of Troy VI or VII, occupied hundreds of years later.

Background 

With the rise of modern critical history, Troy and the Trojan War were consigned to the realms of legend. As early as 1822, however,  the famed Scottish journalist and geologist Charles Maclaren had identified the mound at Hissarlik, near the town of Chanak (Çanakkale) in north-western Anatolia, Turkey, as a possible site of Homeric Troy.

Later, starting in the 1840s, Frank Calvert (1828–1908),  an English expatriate who was an enthusiastic amateur archaeologist as well as a consular official in the eastern Mediterranean region, began exploratory excavations on the mound, part of which was on a farm belonging to his family, and ended up amassing a large collection of artefacts from the site. 

Meanwhile, Heinrich Schliemann, a well-heeled international entrepreneur and passionate antiquities hunter, had begun searching in Turkey for the site of the historical Troy, starting at Pınarbaşı, a hilltop at the south end of the Trojan Plain. Disappointed there,  Schliemann was about to give up his explorations when Calvert suggested excavating the mound of Hissarlik. Guided to the site by Calvert, Schliemann conducted excavations there in 1871–73 and 1878–79, uncovering (and substantially destroying) the ruins of a series of ancient cities, dating from the Bronze Age to the Roman period. Schliemann declared one of these cities—at first Troy I, later Troy II—to be the city of Troy, and this identification was widely accepted at that time.

His and Calvert's findings included the thousands of artefacts – such as diadems of woven gold, rings, bracelets, intricate earrings and necklaces, buttons, belts and brooches – which Schliemann, in his  ignorance, chose to call "Priam's treasure."

Schliemann described one great moment of discovery, which supposedly occurred on or about May 27, 1873, in his typically colorful, if unreliable, manner:

Schliemann's oft-repeated story of the treasure being carried by his wife, Sophie, in her shawl was untrue. Schliemann later admitted making it up, saying that at the time of the discovery Sophie was in fact with her family in Athens, following the death of her father.

Treasure 

A partial catalogue of the treasure is approximately as follows:
 a copper shield
 a copper cauldron with handles
 an unknown copper artifact, perhaps the hasp of a chest
 a silver vase containing two gold diadems (the "Jewels of Helen"), 8750 gold rings, buttons and other small objects, six gold bracelets, two gold goblets
 a copper vase
 a wrought gold bottle
 two gold cups, one wrought, one cast
 a number of red terracotta goblets
 an electrum cup (mixture of gold, silver, and copper)
 six wrought silver knife blades (which Schliemann put forward as money)
 three silver vases with fused copper parts
 more silver goblets and vases
 thirteen copper lance heads
 fourteen copper axes
 seven copper daggers
 other copper artifacts with the key to a chest

Art collection 

Apparently, Schliemann smuggled Priam's Treasure out of Anatolia. The officials were informed when his wife, Sophia, wore the jewels for the public. The Ottoman official assigned to watch the excavation, Amin Effendi, received a prison sentence. The Ottoman government revoked Schliemann's permission to dig and sued him for its share of the gold. Schliemann went on to Mycenae. There, however, the Greek Archaeological Society sent an agent to monitor him.

Later Schliemann traded some treasure to the government of the Ottoman Empire in exchange for permission to dig at Troy again. It is located in the Istanbul Archaeology Museum. The rest was acquired in 1881 by the Royal Museums of Berlin (Königliche Museen zu Berlin).

After the capture of the Zoo Tower by the Red Army during the Battle in Berlin, Professor Wilhelm Unverzagt turned the treasure over to the Soviet Art Committee, saving it from plunder and division. The artefacts were then flown to Moscow. During the Cold War, the Soviet government denied any knowledge of the fate of Priam's Treasure. However, in 1994 the Pushkin Museum admitted it possessed the Trojan gold.

Russia keeps what the West terms the looted art as compensation for the destruction of Russian cities and looting of Russian museums by Nazi Germany in World War II. A 1998 Russian law, the Federal Law on Cultural Valuables Displaced to the USSR as a Result of the Second World War and Located on the Territory of the Russian Federation, legalizes the looting in Germany as compensation and prevents Russian authorities from proceeding to restitutions.

Authenticity

Correlating with the criticism on Schliemann's methods and motivations, doubts about the authenticity of the treasure have been voiced. Notions are it not being a singular find, but rather a composite, and the nomenclature, as the described layer of origin is now agreed to be prior to King Priam's lifetime. Even Schliemann himself rectified his initial description of the finding circumstances, having sent away foreign helpers and recovering the items only in the presence of his wife. Since its whereabouts have not been publicly known for half a century, modern scientific analysis of the artifacts and therefore proof or disproof of Schliemann's claims were impossible for a long period of time.

Notes

References 

 Silberman, Neil Asher (1989). Between Past and Present: Archaeology, Ideology and Nationalism in the Modern Middle East, Doubleday, .
 Smith, Philip, editor (1976). Heinrich Schliemann: Troy and Its Remains: A Narrative of Researches and Discoveries Made on the Site of Ilium, and in the Trojan Plain, Arno Press, New York,  .
  A catalog of artifacts from Schliemann's excavations at Troy, with photographs.
 Traill, David (1997). Schliemann of Troy: Treasure and Deceit, St. Martin's Press, 
 Wood, Michael (1987). In Search of the Trojan War, New American Library, .

External links 

 Art News article, originally published in April 1991 revealing the secret Soviet collections of looted art, including the Schliemann collection.
 Calvert's Heirs Claim Schliemann Treasure
 
 Looted Art BBC radio documentary on art looted by the Soviets at the end of World War II, with special mention of the Schliemann collection
 Pushkin Museum of Fine Arts collection of Schliemann's treasure

Art collections in Germany
Art collections in Russia
Troy
Treasure troves of Turkey
Archaeological discoveries in Turkey
1873 archaeological discoveries
Art and cultural repatriation after World War II
Tourist attractions in Moscow
Gold objects
Art crime
Antiquities of the Pushkin Museum
Russia–Turkey relations